Carlos Miguel Pereira Alves (born 6 February 1988) is a Portuguese professional footballer who plays for Olivais e Moscavide as a left back.

Club career
Born in Oeiras, Lisbon District, Alves finished his development at local C.F. Os Belenenses. He failed to appear in any competitive matches with the club, being subsequently loaned to neighbouring Atlético Clube de Portugal and Clube Oriental de Lisboa in the third division; in 2009, he signed permanently with the latter.

Alves continued competing in the lower leagues until the age of 26, successively representing C.O. Montijo, AD Oeiras, S.U. 1º de Dezembro and Oriental. In the 2013–14 season, he achieved promotion to the Segunda Liga with the latter team.

References

External links
 
 
 

1988 births
Living people
People from Oeiras, Portugal
Portuguese footballers
Association football defenders
Liga Portugal 2 players
Segunda Divisão players
C.F. Os Belenenses players
Atlético Clube de Portugal players
Clube Oriental de Lisboa players
AD Oeiras players
C.D. Cova da Piedade players
S.U. Sintrense players
GS Loures players
Portugal youth international footballers
Portugal under-21 international footballers
Sportspeople from Lisbon District